Bonjour Television Network is an American TV broadcasting company.  All of its programmes are aired in the French language.

History
Bonjour Television Network was established in 2013 in Miami, Florida, by Victor J. Romero with the intent of offering programming for French-speaking people in the United States.

The network announced the launch of their first four channels on May 18, 2014: Bonjour Television, Xplore Channel, Bonjour Music and Men's Up.

On September 17, 2014, Bonjour announced the launch of Fight Channel World.

Programming
Bonjour Television offers programmes in the following categories:
Films
Drama
News
Documentaries (Xplore channel)
Reality
Music (Bonjour Music 24/7 channel).

References

External links
 

Television stations in the United States
Television networks in the United States
French television-related lists
French-language television stations
French-language television networks
Foreign-language television stations in the United States